The National AFL Rising Star award is given annually to a stand out young player in the Australian Football League. The 2003 medal was awarded to  player, Sam Mitchell.

Eligibility
Every round, an Australian Football League rising star nomination is given to a stand out young player. To be eligible for the award, a player must be under 21 on 1 January of that year, have played 10 or fewer senior games and not been suspended during the season.  At the end of the year, one of the 22 nominees is the winner of award.

Nominations

Final voting

References

Afl Rising Star, 2003
Afl Rising Star, 2003
Australian rules football-related lists